Antonio de Hervias, O.P. (died  in 1590), was a Roman Catholic prelate who served as Archbishop of Cartagena (1587–1590), 
Bishop of Verapaz (1579–1587), 
and the first Bishop of Arequipa (1577–1579).

Biography
Son of Marcos de Hervias and Ana Calderón, he studied at the Colegio de San Gregorio of Valladolid, and he studied at the convent of Sant Esteve in Salamanca.

Antonio de Hervias was ordained a priest in the Order of Preachers. 
 On 15 April 1577 he was selected by the King of Spain and confirmed by Pope Gregory XIII as Bishop of Arequipa. 
 On 9 January 1579 he was selected by the King of Spain and confirmed by Pope Gregory XIII as Bishop of Verapaz. 
 On 28 September 1587 he was selected by the King of Spain and confirmed by Pope Sixtus V as Archbishop of Cartagena where he served until his death on 28 September 1587.

References

External links and additional sources
 (for Chronology of Bishops) 
 (for Chronology of Bishops) 
 (for Chronology of Bishops) 
 (for Chronology of Bishops) 
 (for Chronology of Bishops) 
 (for Chronology of Bishops) 

1587 deaths
16th-century Roman Catholic bishops in New Granada
Bishops appointed by Pope Gregory XIII
Bishops appointed by Pope Sixtus V
Roman Catholic bishops of Cartagena in Colombia
Dominican bishops
16th-century Roman Catholic bishops in Guatemala
16th-century Roman Catholic bishops in Peru
Roman Catholic bishops of Verapaz
Roman Catholic bishops of Arequipa